John Henry Dowse (born 27 March 1935) was a rugby union player who represented Australia.

Dowse, a fly-half, was born in Mackay, Queensland and claimed a total of 4 international rugby caps for Australia. 

He was married to the author Sara Dowse from 1958 to 1977. They have three sons and a daughter.

References

Australian rugby union players
Australia international rugby union players
1935 births
Living people
Rugby union players from Queensland
Rugby union fly-halves